The Hazaras is book on the history of Hazara people and Afghanistan by the writer Hassan Poladi.

See also
 The Hazara People and Greater Khorasan by Muhammad Taqi Khavari
 The Hazaras of Afghanistan by Syed Askar Mousavi

References

Hazara people
1989 non-fiction books
History books about Afghanistan